Golden Harvest or The Golden Harvest may refer to:

 Orange Sky Golden Harvest, a film production, distribution and exhibition company based in Hong Kong, often shortened to Golden Harvest
 The Golden Harvest, a 1944 novel by Brazilian author Jorge Amado
 Golden Harvest (band), a New Zealand band
 Golden Harvest (album), the band's debut 1978 album
 Golden Harvest Seeds, a U.S.-based subsidiary of Syngenta that produces hybrid seed for agriculture
 Golden Harvest (My Little Pony), a My Little Pony Earth pony
 Golden Harvest (film), a 1933 American drama
 Golden Harvest (book), a 2011 book by Jan T. Gross